Love & Hate is the second studio album by London-based singer-songwriter Michael Kiwanuka. The album was released on 15 July 2016 by Polydor Records (UK) and Interscope Records (US).

Background
The album is the follow-up record to Kiwanuka's 2012 Mercury Prize-nominated album Home Again. The album was produced by Danger Mouse, Inflo, and Paul Butler. Love & Hate also released three singles. The first single, "Black Man in a White World" was released on 28 March 2016, and was accompanied by a video directed by Hiro Murai. The second single, "Love & Hate", was released on 7 April 2016.

Usage in media
The song "Cold Little Heart" is also known for being the opening theme of the HBO television series Big Little Lies.

The song "Love & Hate" featured in various shows and films, including the series finale of the Netflix drama Seven Seconds, the Netflix docudrama When They See Us, the legal drama Suits (season 7, episode 8), Rosewood (season 1, episode 22), Animal Kingdom (season 3, episode 11) and the movie The Tax Collector. In 2019, it was used in the italian movie  and in 2021, it was again used in an Italian production,  (episode 2, final scene and credits), based in the final season of footballer Francesco Totti at AS Roma.
 
The song "Black Man in a White World" is performed by John Clarence Stewart, in character as Simon Haynes, in "Zoey's Extraordinary Reckoning", the sixth episode of the second season of the musical comedy-drama series Zoey's Extraordinary Playlist.

The song "Rule the World" was featured in the Netflix series The Get Down and the HBO Max original series Hacks.

Critical reception

Upon its release, Love & Hate received widespread critical acclaim from music critics. At Metacritic, which assigns a normalized rating out of 100 to reviews from mainstream critics, the album has received an average score of 86, based on 23 reviews, indicating "universal acclaim". The Telegraph said "This is an album that sounds like a world of music in itself", while The Guardian called the album "the work of an artist coming into his own". Writing for Exclaim!, Ryan B. Patrick lauded Kiwanuka's "introspective study of himself and his standing in a post-millennial world".

Track listing

Personnel
Adapted from the Love & Hate booklet.

Performers and musicians
 Michael Kiwanuka – vocals ; electric guitar ; lead guitar ; acoustic guitar ; guitar ; bass ; piano ; backing vocals 
 Inflo – piano ; drums ; bass ; backing vocals 
 Brian Burton – bass ; percussion ; synth pad ; piano ; organ 
 Graham Godfrey – drums ; percussion ; hand claps ; backing vocals, ; tape machine FX 
 Paul Butler – percussion ; cello and trumpet ; electric guitar, keys, drum machines and backing vocals ; clavinet, Moog, piano and Yamaha CS-80 
 Andy Parkin – violin 
 Miles James – electric guitar 
 Pete Randall – double bass ; Fender bass VI ; backing vocals 
 Gary Plumley – flute ; saxophone 
 James Bateman – saxophone 
 Paul Boldeau, Phebe Edwards, LaDonna Harley-Peters – backing vocals 
 Wired Strings 
 Jenny Sacha – violin 
 Gillon Cameron, Anna Croad, Sally Jackson, Patrick Kieman, Eleanor Mathieson, Kotono Sato, Debbie Widdup – violin 
 Natalia Bonner – violin 
 Kerenza Peacock – violin 
 Emma Owens – viola 
 Nzomi Cohen – viola 
 Becky Jones – viola 
 Rosie Danvers – cello ; string arrangements 
 Bryony James – cello 
 Richard Pryce – double bass 
 Huw White – string arrangements 

Technical
 Brian Burton (as Danger Mouse) – production ; vocal production 
 Inflo – production ; strings production 
 Paul Butler – production, engineering and mixing ; vocal production 
 Kennie Takahashi – engineering ; mixing 
 Richard Woodcraft – engineering ; strings engineering; mixing 
 Todd Monfalcone – engineering ; mixing assistant 
 Dave Granshaw – engineering 
 Jon McMullen – engineering ; mix engineering 
 Samur Khouja – engineering 
 Guy Davie – mastering

Charts

Weekly charts

Year-end charts

References

External links
Kiwanuka's homepage

2016 albums
Michael Kiwanuka albums
Interscope Records albums
Polydor Records albums
Albums produced by Danger Mouse (musician)
Albums recorded at RAK Studios
Albums produced by Inflo